Pehkonen is a Finnish surname. Notable people with the surname include:

 Eero Yrjö Pehkonen (1882–1949), Finnish politician
 Eila Pehkonen (1924–1991), Finnish actress
 Keijo Pehkonen (1964), Finnish wrestler
 Mari Pehkonen (born 1985), Finnish ice hockey player

References

Finnish-language surnames